Grypania is an early, tube-shaped fossil from the Proterozoic eon. The organism, with a size over one centimeter and consistent form, could have been a giant bacterium, a bacterial colony, or a eukaryotic alga. The oldest probable Grypania fossils date to about 2100 million years ago (redated from the previous 1870 million) and the youngest extended into the Ediacaran period. This implies that the time range of this taxon extended for 1200 million years.

References

External links

 Grypania spiralis (scroll down) in "Major Events in the History of Life" 
 Grypania spiralis photo gallery, specimens from Negaunee Iron Formation, Michigan

Proterozoic life
Fossil algae
Ediacaran life
Precambrian fossils
Prehistoric life genera